Matt Hamilton or Matthew Hamilton may refer to:

Matt Hamilton (curler) (born 1989), American curler
Matt Hamilton (racing driver) (born 1990), British racing driver

See also
 Hamilton (surname and title)